The 2022 Platzmann-Sauerland Open was a professional tennis tournament played on clay courts. It was the second edition of the tournament which was part of the 2022 ATP Challenger Tour. It took place in Lüdenscheid, Germany, between 27 June and 3 July 2022.

Singles main draw entrants

Seeds

 1 Rankings as of 20 June 2022.

Other entrants
The following players received wildcards into the singles main draw:
  Rudolf Molleker
  Marko Topo
  Marcel Zielinski

The following players received entry into the singles main draw as alternates:
  Nicholas David Ionel
  Tobias Kamke
  Alexey Vatutin

The following players received entry from the qualifying draw:
  Bogdan Bobrov
  Jeremy Jahn
  Georgii Kravchenko
  Hamad Međedović
  Mohamed Safwat
  Timo Stodder

The following player received entry as a lucky loser:
  Denis Yevseyev

Champions

Singles 

  Hamad Međedović def.  Zhang Zhizhen 6–1, 6–2.

Doubles 

  Robin Haase /  Sem Verbeek def.  Fabian Fallert /  Hendrik Jebens 6–2, 5–7, [10–3].

References

Platzmann-Sauerland Open
Platzmann-Sauerland Open
June 2022 sports events in Germany
July 2022 sports events in Germany